Aniragu, also known as Kahugu.

Numerals
Gbiri-Niragu has, or had, a duodecimal number system.

References

East Kainji languages
Languages of Nigeria